Kill or Be Killed may refer to:

Film and TV 
 Kill or Be Killed (1942 film), British documentary short film
 Kill or Be Killed (1950 film), American film
 Kill or Be Killed (1966 film), Italian Spaghetti Western
 Kill or Be Killed (1980 film), South African martial arts film
 Kill or Be Killed (2015 film), American Western film
 "Kill or Be Killed" (The Vampire Diaries), 2010 episode of The Vampire Diaries

Music 
 Kill or Be Killed (Biohazard album), 2003
 Kill or Be Killed (Deniro Farrar and Shady Blaze album), 2012
 "Kill or Be Killed" (song), song by Muse from their 2022 album Will of the People

Other 
 Kill or Be Killed (comics), ongoing American comic book series that began in 2016